Bangla Bangers, later followed by sequel-series Chop Shop: London Garage, was a reality program on the Discovery Channel about  Bangladeshi coachbuilder Nizamuddin "Leepu" Awlia and Cockney mechanic Bernie Fineman. In every episode they and their team attempt to build a supercar in a mere matter of weeks out of an automobile which they generally obtain from a wrecking yard.

Leepu converts rusting old autos into Ferrari and Lamborghini styled fast sports cars and limousines in his small workshop in Bangladesh's capital of Dhaka, and then later in the "Chop Shop" garage he and Bernie operate out of in Brick Lane, which is Britain's largest Bangladeshi community. What makes these episodes notable is that the vehicles constructed by the team are made in a meager shop using lo-tech, basic tools; the bodywork is handmade from sheet metal. Assisted by Bernie's mechanical expertise, the improvements are sometimes questionable.

On 6 September 2009 the 1988 SAAB 900 Turbo that the Chop Shop team rebuilt into a one-off 'Gangsta Car' for Martin Kemp was demolished by monster truck Podzilla during the VW Action car festival at Santa Pod Raceway, the very same place where the new car first broke down prior to its initial test run.
a workshop is located in Cudworth St. 20A / Tent Street 108

Episodes
Chop Shop: London Garage

Season 1

Episode 1 – Car Fireworks	 
Episode 2 – Phoenix Reveal		 
Episode 3 – Super Surfer		 
Episode 4 – Angel Cab		 
Episode 5 – Tiger Car		 
Episode 6 – Frog Eco Car		 
Episode 7 – Boy Racer Car		 
Episode 8 – Flame Racer		 
Episode 9 – Congestion Buster		 
Episode 10 – Huntin' Car		 
Episode 11 – Virgin Car	 
Episode 12 – Best of Series 1

Season 2

Episode 1 – Saab 900 Turbo		 
Episode 2 – Saab 900 Turbo		 
Episode 3 – Ford Capri	 
Episode 4 – Ford Capri		 
Episode 5 – Rover Concept	 
Episode 6 – Rover Concept		 
Episode 7 – VW Golf		 
Episode 8 – VW Golf		 
Episode 9 – Porsche 944	 
Episode 10 – Porsche 944
Episode 11 – Best of Series 2

Cast and characters
 Leepu Nizamuddin Awlia as himself
 Bernie Fineman as himself

References

External links
Chop Shop: London Garage

2007 British television series debuts
Automotive television series
Discovery Channel original programming
Vehicle modification media
2007 Bangladeshi television series debuts